The 47-th District of Brest (also 47-th District «East Coast», due to the location in the eastern coast of Bug) self-proclaimed partisan formation of the Home Army, valid from December 1944 to January 1951 in Western Belarus in the Polesia region, on the modern territory of the Brest Region in the Brest and Zhabinka districts in the Byelorussian SSR. The unit was commanded by a former sergeant of the Polish Army, the self-proclaimed captain Daniił  Trepliński («Baszta»).

History 
The unit was created after the arrest of the commander of the Home Army District of Polesie colonel Henryk Krajewski «Leśny», in December 1944. The organizer of this unit was sergeant Daniił Trepliński, who unauthorizedly appropriated the rank of captain.

The unit was autonomous, not subordinate to any of the structures of the Home Army and the Polish Underground State. They fought against the establishment of Soviet in Polesie, ideologically they were supporters of Polish statehood until 1939.

The very first action took place on 22 January 1945, when a squad of 200 partisans under the command of «Baszta» attacked a temporary prison near the village of Zelenets and released the prisoners there and joining them to his unit. Among them was the criminal authority Aleksander Rusovski, who, subsequently, was one of the commanders of the unit.

In June–September 1945, in the Brest region alone, 23 attacks were made on military units, 4 of them in the Brest region and 1 in Zhabinkovsky. In February–June 1945, 28 people were killed in the territory of the Brest District mainly activists of the Communist Party with their families, including their children. «Baszta» conducted active recruitment into the unit and by June 1946 the number of detachments had grown to 500 partisans.

Also, members of the squad committed acts of murder of residents of Ukrainian ethnicity and migrants from the Ukrainian SSR. In March 1946, the detachment of «Viktor» in the Zhabinka District got into a fight with the UPA unit of commandant «Sokil». After this clash, on 11 March, a detachment of 30 partisans attacked the village of Saleiki and staged a pogrom against the Ukrainians, killing several people.

In September 1946, at the entrance of a military operation in the Brest region, conducted by the MVD, serious damage was caused to the unit and the conspiratorial network. After that, the partisans no longer made attacks on large squads, however, they continued to attack small groups of Soviet militia members, liquidate individual officers of the Soviet special services and party activists. There was also usual gangsterism, for example, shop robberies, for example, on 3–8 May 1949, the Rusovski squad robbed shops in Pokry, Skoldychi and Kholmichi, in the territory of the Brest Region.

The last major action carried out by the unit took place on 12–14 March 1950, before the upcoming elections to the Supreme Soviet of the USSR, by blowing up electoral precincts in Thelmy, Cherni, Zaberezie and Zhabinka.

In December 1949 Rusowski was liquidated, in December 1950 «Viktor» was liquidated. In January 1951, «Baszta» dissolved the formation and gave «Szary» the authority to organize the withdrawal of partisans to Poland. However, «Szary» was liquidated in February, and on March 6 Treplinsky himself was eliminated along with his wife near the village Sherbin.

On 20 March 4 former partisans from the detachment who tried to cross the border were detained on the Polish-Soviet border near the village of Kleiniki, and on 11 April, the last partisan Daniił Dubrowny was liquidated in the village of Cherni.

References

External links 
 (In Russian) Армия Крайова в белорусском Полесье. Банда “Басты”.

Units and formations of the Home Army
Polish underground organisations during World War II
Guerrilla organizations
World War II resistance movements
Military units and formations established in 1944
Military units and formations disestablished in 1951
Anti-Ukrainian sentiment in Europe
Polish resistance during World War II
Anti-communism in Belarus